The Silver Stone Trophy was originally designed and produced for the now defunct European Hockey League (1997-2000) by Italian artist Enzo Bosi. It weighs seven kilograms in silver chisel, equivalent to one British stone, hence the name The Silver Stone. From 2005 until 2008, it was awarded to the winner of the IIHF European Champions Cup, with the winning team receiving a 1:1 replica of the trophy.  In 2009, it was awarded to the winner of the Champions Hockey League.

Winners of the Silver Stone Trophy 
European Hockey League
 1997 HC TPS 
 1998 VEU Feldkirch 
 1999 Metallurg Magnitogorsk 
 2000 Metallurg Magnitogorsk 

European Champions Cup
 2005 Avangard Omsk 
 2006 Dynamo Moscow 
 2007 Ak Bars Kazan 
 2008 Metallurg Magnitogorsk 

Champions Hockey League
 2009 ZSC Lions

References

Ice hockey trophies and awards
European Hockey League
Champions Hockey League (2008–09)
IIHF European Champions Cup